The following is a list of titles featuring the Marvel Comics character Daredevil.

Primary series

 Daredevil #1–380 (April 1964 – Oct. 1998)
 Daredevil Special #1 (Sept. 1967)
 Daredevil Special #2 (Feb. 1971; reprints)
 Daredevil Special #3 (Jan. 1972; reprints)
 Daredevil Annual #4 (1976)
 Daredevil Annual #4 (1989) Note: Mislabelled as #4, rather than #5, both on cover and in indicia.
 Daredevil Annual #6–10 (1990–1994)
 Daredevil/Deadpool '97 Annual (1997)
 Daredevil Vol. 2, #1–119 [#381–499] (Nov. 1998 – Aug. 2009) Note: With issue #22, began official dual-numbering with original series, as #22 / 402, etc.
 Daredevil Annual #1 (2007)
 Daredevil #500–512 (Oct. 2009 – Dec. 2010) Original numbering resumes.
 Daredevil Vol. 3, #1–36, #10.1 [#513-548] (July 2011 – February 2014)
 Daredevil Annual #1 (2012)
 Daredevil Vol. 4 #1–18, #1.50, #15.1 [#549–566] (March 2014 – September 2015)
 Daredevil Vol. 5 #1–28 [#567–594] (February 2016–December 2017)
 Daredevil Annual #1 (2016)
 Daredevil #595-612 (2017 – 2018) Original numbering resumes.
 Daredevil Annual #1 (2018)
 Daredevil Vol. 6 #1-36 [#613-648] (2019 –2021)
 Daredevil Annual #1 (2020)
 Daredevil Vol. 7 #1- [#649-] (2022)

One-shots and limited series
 Giant-Size Daredevil #1 (1975)
 Daredevil/Black Widow: Abattoir (July 1993, graphic novel)
 Daredevil: Man Without Fear #1–5 (Oct. 1993 – Feb. 1994) by Frank Miller and John Romita, Jr.
 Daredevil #1/2 (17-page comic published within Wizard #96, Aug. 1999)
 Daredevil: Ninja #1–3 (Dec. 2000 – May 2001) by Brian Michael Bendis and Rob Haynes
 Daredevil: Yellow #1–6 (Aug. 2001 – Jan. 2002) by Jeph Loeb and Tim Sale
 Ultimate Daredevil and Elektra #1-4 (October 2002 - February 2003) by Greg Rucka and Salvador Larocca
 Daredevil: The Target (per indicia), also known as Daredevil/Bullseye: The Target (per cover), #1 (Jan. 2003) by Kevin Smith and Glenn Fabry
 Daredevil: Father #1–6 (June 2004, Oct. 2005 – Jan. 2006) by Joe Quesada
 Daredevil: 2099 #1 (Nov. 2004) by Robert Kirkman
 Daredevil: Redemption #1–6 (April–Aug. 2005; no cover dates; #1-2 both indicia-dated April 2005) by David Hine and Michael Gaydos
 Captain Universe/Daredevil #1 (Jan. 2006)
 Daredevil: Battlin' Jack Murdock #1-4 (2007)
 Dark Reign: The List - Daredevil (September 2009)
 Daredevil: Cage Match #1 (July 2010)
 Shadowland #1–5 (September 2010–January 2011)
 Daredevil: Black & White #1 (October 2010)
 Daredevil: Flashback #-1
 Daredevil: Official Movie Adaptation #1
 Daredevil: Reborn #1-4 (2011)
 Daredevil : Dark Nights #1-8 (2012-2013)
 Daredevil : Road Warrior Infinite Comic #1-4 (2014); later reprinted as Issue #0.1 in the Daredevil Vol. 4 series
 Daredevil/Punisher #1-4 (2016); originally distributed as Daredevil/Punisher: Seventh Circle Infinite Comic #1-8
 Man Without Fear #1–5 (Jan. 2019) by Jed MacKay
 Devil's Reign #1-6 (2022)
 Devil's Reign Omega #1 (2022)
 Daredevil: Woman Without Fear #1-3 (2022)

Team-ups
 Spider-Man and Daredevil Special Edition #1 (March 1984; reprints)
 Daredevil and the Punisher: Child's Play #1 (1988; reprints)
 Daredevil/Spider-Man #1–4 (Jan.−Apr. 2001)
 Spider-Man/Daredevil #1 (Oct. 2002)
 Daredevil vs. Punisher: Means and Ends #1–6 (Sept. 2005 – Jan. 2006; no cover dates; #1-2 both indicia-dated Sept. 2005) by David Lapham
 Daredevil & Captain America: Dead on Arrival #1 (November 2008)

Company crossovers
 Daredevil/Batman: Eye for an Eye (per indicia), also known as Daredevil and Batman (per cover), #1 (Jan. 1997)
 Shi/Daredevil #1 (Jan. 1997)
 Daredevil/Shi #1 (Feb. 1997)
 Batman/Daredevil: King of New York #1 (Dec. 2000)
 Magdalena/Daredevil (May 2008)

Other
 Marvel Adventure #1–6 (Dec. 1975 – Oct. 1976) Marvel Daredevil reprint series. Reprints Daredevil Vol. 1 #22-27.
 The Daredevils #1–11 (1982 – Nov. 1983) Marvel UK series, mostly reprints.
 Daredevil vs. Vapora #1 (1993) Free health-and-safety comic sponsored by Gas Appliance Manufacturers Association & Consumer Product Safety Commission.
 Marvels Comics: Daredevil #1 (July 2000)
 Astonishing Tales #4 (July 2009)

Collected editions

Marvel Platinum

Marvel Masterworks: Daredevil

Essential Daredevil

Epic Collection

Daredevil Omnibus

Marvel Knights

Ultimate Collection

Volume 1

Volume 2 (Marvel Knights Era)

Volumes 3 & 4 (Mark Waid Era)

Volume 5 (Charles Soule Era)

Volume 6 & 7 (Chip Zdarsky Era)

One-Shots & Miniseries

References

External links
Daredevil at the Grand Comics Database
Daredevil at Marvel.com
Wolk, Douglas. "Secrets, lies — and lawyers!". Salon.com. January 5, 2006.
Marvel Toonzone: Daredevil
Daredevil cover gallery

 
Marvel Comics titles
Lists of comic book titles
Lists of comics by character
Lists of comics by Marvel Comics